The 2007 Adamawa State gubernatorial election was the 4th gubernatorial election of Adamawa State. Held on April 14, 2007, the People's Democratic Party nominee Murtala Nyako won the election, defeating Joel Madaki of the Labour Party.

Results 
Murtala Nyako from the People's Democratic Party won the election, defeating Joel Madaki from the Labour Party. Registered voters was 1,315,950.

References 

Adamawa State gubernatorial elections
Adamawa gubernatorial